Catherine (Emily) Cox  is an Australian conductor and music director of choirs.

Education
Emily Cox graduated from the Dartmouth College (USA) and the Queensland Conservatorium of Music in Brisbane and continued her education overseas, most notably with Swedish conductor Eric Ericson.

Career
Since January 2003, she has worked as music director of the Brisbane Chorale. She is also music director of Canticum Chamber Choir, and conductor of the Conservatorium Chamber Choir at the Queensland Conservatorium of Music.
She is a lecturer in choral studies at the Queensland Conservatorium Griffith University.

Cox works nationally as a festival and workshop director, adjudicator and choral educator. She performs as a conductor and chorus master at leading Australian performing arts centres such as the Queensland Performing Arts Centre and major arts festivals.

She is married to organist Christopher Wrench.

References

External links
 Official page of Canticum Chamber Choir
 Official page of Brisbane Chorale

Australian choral conductors
Living people
Year of birth missing (living people)
Place of birth missing (living people)
21st-century conductors (music)
Members of the Order of Australia